Ellis Hall is an administration building on the campus of Hendrix College in Conway, Arkansas.  It is basically a large two-story house, with Craftsman styling, built in 1913 to a design by Charles L. Thompson, who also designed several other buildings on the Hendrix campus.  The building served as the college's President's House until 1980, and now houses the college's admissions and financial aid offices.

The building was listed on the National Register of Historic Places in 1982.

See also
National Register of Historic Places listings in Faulkner County, Arkansas

References

Houses on the National Register of Historic Places in Arkansas
Houses completed in 1913
Houses in Conway, Arkansas
Hendrix College